Tegano may refer to:

People
Pasquale Tegano, Italian gangster
Giovanni Tegano, Italian gangster

Places
Tegano, Rennell Island

Italian-language surnames